San Carlos is a department located in Salta Province, in Argentina.

With an area of  it borders to the east with the La Viña Department, to the southeast with Cafayate Department, to the northeast with Chicoana Department, to the north with Cachi Department, to the west with Molinos Department and to the south and southwest with the province of Catamarca.

Towns and municipalities
 Angastaco
 Animaná
 San Carlos
 El Barrial
 Jasimaná
 La Angostura
 Mina Don Otto
 Monteverde
 Pucará
 Santa Rosa
 Amblayo
 Paraje Corralito
 Paraje San Antonio
 Payogastilla

References

External links 

 Departments of Salta Province website

Departments of Salta Province